Tomomyzinae is a subfamily of bee flies in the family Bombyliidae. There are at least 6 genera and more than 50 described species in Tomomyzinae.

Genera
These six genera belong to the subfamily Tomomyzinae:
 Amphicosmus Coquillett, 1891 i c g b
 Docidomyia White, 1916 c g
 Metacosmus Coquillett, 1891 i c g
 Pantostomus Bezzi, 1921 c g
 Paracosmus Osten Sacken, 1877 i c g b
 Tomomyza Wiedemann, 1820 c g
Data sources: i = ITIS, c = Catalogue of Life, g = GBIF, b = Bugguide.net

References

Further reading

 
 

Bombyliidae